Ploskoye is a rural locality (a selo) and the administrative center of Ploskovsky Selsoviet, Tretyakovsky District, Altai Krai, Russia. The population was 737 as of 2013. There are 6 streets.

Geography 
Ploskoye is located 33 km southeast of Staroaleyskoye (the district's administrative centre) by road. Yekaterininskoye is the nearest rural locality.

References 

Rural localities in Tretyakovsky District